Jayawickrama is a Sinhalese surname. Notable people with the surname include:

Chinthaka Jayawickrama, Sri Lankan cricketer
Gamini Jayawickrama Perera, Sri Lankan politician
Montague Jayawickrama, Sri Lankan politician 
U. S. Jayawickrama, Sri Lankan physician

Sinhalese surnames